Ketosamine-3-kinase is an enzyme that in humans is encoded by the FN3KRP (fructosamine-3-kinase-related-protein) gene.

References

Further reading